Aldington is a village and civil parish in the Wychavon district of Worcestershire, England. It is about three miles east of Evesham, and according to the census of 2001, had a population of 232.

References

External links
 
 History of Aldington
 

Villages in Worcestershire